The Podium is a high, flat ice-covered bluff,  in extent, which projects at the south end of the Worcester Range and surmounts the ice-filled embayment between Cape Teall and Cape Timberlake. So named by Advisory Committee on Antarctic Names (US-ACAN) in 1964 because of its position relative to nearby features and its resemblance to a podium.

Cliffs of the Ross Dependency
Hillary Coast